The Offshore and Onshore Reliability Data (OREDA) project was established in 1981 in cooperation with the Norwegian Petroleum Directorate (now Petroleum Safety Authority Norway). It is "one of the main reliability data sources for the oil and gas industry" and considered "a unique data source on failure rates, failure mode distribution and repair times for equipment used in the offshore industr[y]. OREDA's original objective was the collection of petroleum industry safety equipment reliability data. The current organization, as a cooperating group of several petroleum and natural gas companies, was established in 1983, and at the same time the scope of OREDA was extended to cover reliability data from a wide range of equipment used in oil and gas exploration and production (E&P). OREDA primarily covers offshore, subsea and topside equipment, but does also include some onshore E&P, and some downstream equipment as well.

The main objective of the OREDA project is to contribute to an improved safety and cost-effectiveness in design and operation of oil and gas E&P facilities, through collection and analysis of maintenance and operational data, establishment of a high quality reliability database, and exchange of reliability, availability, maintenance and safety (RAMS) technology among the participating companies.

History
Work on the OREDA project proceeds in phases spanning 2–3 years. Handbooks summarizing the data collected and other work completed are issued regularly.

 Phase I (1983–1985)The primary activity during this phase was the collection and compilation of offshore drilling installations, and the publication of these data in the first OREDA Handbook. This demonstrated the ability of the eight petroleum industry companies involved in the project to cooperate on safety issues. While data in this initial phase included a wide range of equipment types, the level of detail was not as complete as in later phases of the project.  Data collected in this phase are published in the OREDA Handbook (1984 edition); Phase I data are not, however, included in the OREDA database.
 Phase II (1987–1990)To improve data quality, the project's scope was altered to include collection of production-critical equipment data only. Data began to be stored in a Windows OS database. The development of a tailor-made data collection and analysis program, the OREDA software, was begun.  Data collected in this phase are published in the OREDA Handbook (1992 edition), which also contains re-published data collected in phase I.
 Phase III (1990–1992)The number of equipment categories included was increased, and more data on maintenance programs were collected. Data quality was improved following established "Guidelines for Data Collection" and via improved quality control. The user interface of the OREDA software was improved, and programming changes allowed it to be used as a broader-purpose tool for data collection.  Data collected in this phase are published in the OREDA Handbook (1997 edition).
 Phase IV (1993–1996)New software for data collection and analysis was developed, plus specific software and procedures for automatic data import and conversion. Data collected were mainly for the same equipment classes as in phase III, and the data collection was — to a greater extent than previously — carried out by the companies themselves. Data on planned maintenance were also included.  Data collected in this phase are published in the OREDA Handbook (2002 edition).
 Phase V (1997–2000)New classes of equipment were added to the project, coinciding with a greater emphasis on the collection of subsea data. Development of a new ISO standard, "Petroleum and natural gas industries — Collection and exchange of reliability and maintenance data for equipment" was begun; ISO standard 14224 was issued in July 1999.  Data collected in this phase are published in the OREDA Handbook (2002 edition).
 Phase VI (2000–2001)Data collection on subsea equipment and new equipment classes were prioritised. A forum for co-operation between major subsea equipment manufacturers was formed.  Data collected in this phase are published in the OREDA Handbook (2009 edition).

 Phase VII (2002–2003)Priority continued to be given to subsea equipment data collection. A revision of ISO 14224 was begun, with contribution from members of the OREDA project.  Data collected in this phase are published in the OREDA Handbook (2009 edition).
 Phase VIII (2004–2005)Phase VIII mainly continued the goals and activities of phase VII. OREDA members participated in the revision of ISO 14224, issued in December 2006.  Data collected in this phase are published in the OREDA Handbook (2015 edition).
 Phase IX (2006–2008)OREDA software and taxonomy were made consistent with ISO 14224. There was a continued focus on including worldwide safety data. In observance of OREDA's 25-year anniversary, a seminar was conducted.  Data collected in this phase are published in the OREDA Handbook (2015 edition).
 Phase X (2009–2011)The 5th OREDA Handbook (2009 edition) was released; new safety analysis software was developed; initial steps to SIL (safety integrity level) data based on OREDA were taken; and GDF Suez and Petrobras became associated members.
 Phase XI (2012–2014)New data collection software was developed; the 6th OREDA Handbook (2015 edition) was planned; a quality assurance review of the database was conducted; a new logo was designed, as were new looks for both the Handbook and the website.
 Phase XII (2015–2017)The OREDA project is in its 12th phase as of 2015. During this phase, the 6th OREDA Handbook (2015 edition) was published. A new webshop for the project has been established in collaboration with the European Safety Reliability & Data Association (ESReDA).
 Phase XIII (2018-)From 2018 the OREDA project will enter its 13th phase. Digitalization and efficiency improvements is part of the industry and there is a  need for OREDA data as a decision support tool and as support for equipment in operation. Cost effective solutions is a focus area in the industry and in line with this trend the OREDA project will provide more efficient procedures and digitalized solutions.

Participants
At times companies have left or joined the project, sometimes as the result of name changes or mergers. The following table lists which companies have contributed data to the OREDA project in phases VIII, IX and XII.

Organization
The OREDA project's Steering Committee consists of one member and one deputy member from each of the participating companies. From these members, a chairperson is elected, and appoints a Project Manager to coordinate activities approved by the steering committee. The Project Manager is also responsible for data quality assurance. Det Norske Veritas (DNV, now called DNV GL), an international certification body and classification society, served as Project Manager during phases I and II and SINTEF (Stiftelsen for INdustriell og TEknisk Forskning; "Foundation for Scientific and Industrial Research" in English) during phases III–IX, after which DNV GL again took over Project Manager duties. The OREDA Handbook releases have been prepared as separate projects, but in consultation with the OREDA Steering Committee; the current version, 2015's 6th Edition, was prepared by SINTEF and NTNU (Norges Teknisk-Naturvitenskapelige Universitet; "Norwegian University of Science and Technology" in English), and is marketed by DNV GL.

Need
Before the OREDA project began collecting data, "no authenticated source of failure information existed for offshore installations," and risk assessments had to be made using "generic data from onshore petroleum plants and data from other industries."

Data
By 1996, OREDA had collated data about 24,000 pieces of equipment in use in offshore installations, and documented 33,000 equipment failures.
The severity of failures documented in the database are categorized as either critical, degradation, incipient, or unknown severity.

The database contains data from almost 300 installations, over 15,000 pieces of equipment, nearly 40,000 failure records, and close to 75,000 maintenance records. Access to this data, and to the search and analysis functions of the OREDA software, is restricted to the OREDA member companies, though contractors working with member companies may be granted temporary access.

Database structure
Data are entered by installation and by owner. Each piece of equipment (e.g. a gas turbine) constitutes a single database inventory record, which includes a technical description of the equipment, and of its environmental and operating conditions, along with all associated failure events. Every failure event is given a set of data including failure cause, date, effect, and mode. Corrective and preventive maintenance data are also included.

Software
The OREDA software handles data acquisition, analysis and collation. Features include advanced data search, automated data transfer, quality checking, reliability analyses, a tailor-made module for subsea data which includes an event-logging tool, and the option to configure user-defined applications. It can also be used to collect internal company data.

The most current version of the software, released in concert with the 6th edition of the OREDA Handbook, contains an expanded set of equipment classes, including common subsea components, subsea control systems, subsea power cables, subsea pumps, and subsea vessels.

Impact
Use of the OREDA database has "led to significant savings in the development and operation of platforms."

OREDA's example has inspired the creation of similar inter-company cooperation projects in related fields, such as the SPARTA (System Performance, Availability and Reliability Trend Analysis) database created by the wind farm industry in the UK.

References

Energy economics
International energy organizations
Organizations established in 1981
Petroleum politics